Alpette (Piedmontese: J'Alpëtte, Franco-Provençal: La Alpete) is a comune (municipality) in the Metropolitan City of Turin in the Italian region Piedmont, located about  north of Turin.

Alpette borders the following municipalities: Pont Canavese, Sparone, Cuorgnè, and Canischio.

References

External links
 Official website

Cities and towns in Piedmont
Canavese
Articles which contain graphical timelines